The buff-throated warbler (Phylloscopus subaffinis) is a species of leaf warbler (family Phylloscopidae). It was formerly included in the "Old World warbler" assemblage.

It breeds in China and winters down toward northern Southeast Asia. Its natural habitat is temperate forests.

References

buff-throated warbler
Birds of China
buff-throated warbler
Taxonomy articles created by Polbot